Charles Euphrasie Kuwasseg (1838, Draveil, Essonne – 1904) was a French painter of the 19th century. He essentially specialized in landscape paintings - particularly the coastal landscapes of Brittany and Normandy.  His father, Karl Joseph Kuwasseg, was an Austrian born in Trieste on March 16, 1802, and also a renowned painter. His father left for Paris, and took French nationality. He died in Paris in January 1877.

The younger Kuwasseg had exhibitions at the Salon of French Artists and the Paris Salon.  He won the bronze medal in 1892 at the Salon of French Artists. Charles received his first training from his father and consequently received his formal training studying under Jean Baptiste Henri Durand-Brager and Eugene Isabey.  Before beginning his formal training he had been a sailor. He was influenced by the Barbizon School.

His work is represented in museums in Montreal, Rouen, Pontoise, Digne and La Rochelle.

Notes

External links

Charles Kuwasseg at Artnet

1838 births
1904 deaths
People from Draveil
19th-century French painters
French male painters
20th-century French painters
20th-century French male artists
French landscape painters
19th-century French male artists